These are the official results of the Men's 4x400 metres event at the 1990 European Championships in Split, Yugoslavia, held at Stadion Poljud on 31 August and 1 September 1990.

Medalists

Results

Final
1 September

Heats
31 August

Heat 1

Heat 2

Participation
According to an unofficial count, 46 athletes from 9 countries participated in the event.

 (5)
 (4)
 (6)
 (4)
 (5)
 (5)
 (6)
 (6)
 (5)

See also
 1988 Men's Olympic 4 × 400 m Relay (Seoul)
 1991 Men's World Championships 4 × 400 m Relay (Tokyo)
 1992 Men's Olympic 4 × 400 m Relay (Barcelona)
 1993 Men's World Championships 4 × 400 m Relay (Stuttgart)

References

 Results

Relay 4 x 400
4 x 400 metres relay at the European Athletics Championships